Zheng Weihai is a Paralympian athlete from China competing mainly in category F57 discus events.

Zheng competed in all three class F57 throwing events in the 2004 Summer Paralympics in Athens, winning a silver medal in the discus.  In 2008 in his home country competing only in the discus he again won a silver medal in the combined F57/58 category.

References

Paralympic athletes of China
Athletes (track and field) at the 2004 Summer Paralympics
Athletes (track and field) at the 2008 Summer Paralympics
Paralympic silver medalists for China
Living people
Chinese male discus throwers
Chinese male javelin throwers
Chinese male shot putters
Medalists at the 2004 Summer Paralympics
Medalists at the 2008 Summer Paralympics
Year of birth missing (living people)
Paralympic medalists in athletics (track and field)
21st-century Chinese people